Special Delivery is a 1976 American neo-noir comedy crime film directed by Paul Wendkos and starring Bo Svenson and Cybill Shepherd.

Plot
A gang of thieves plan a daring bank robbery, making their escape across the rooftops of Los Angeles. The police are quickly called in, however, and only one of the robbers, Murdock, makes a clean getaway. Unfortunately, in order to do so, he is forced to dump the stolen cash into a mailbox, which he then finds is locked until midnight, forcing him to wait until the mailman makes his late night pickup. As he waits, he discovers that his hiding place has been observed by several other people, all of whom want a share of the loot.

Cast
Bo Svenson as Jack Murdock.
Cybill Shepherd as Mary Jane
Tom Atkins as Zabelski
Sorrell Booke as Hubert Zane
Gerrit Graham as Swivot
Michael C. Gwynne as Graff

Reception
Vincent Canby of The New York Times was not amused: "Michael C. Gwynne has some good moments as a junkie, but neither Paul Wendkos, who directed the film, nor Don Gazzaniga, who wrote it, is very adept at melodrama and action. The film ends in a car chase of the sort that makes you realize that the screeching of tires has become the most overused and boring sound in movies today."

References

External links

1976 films
Films directed by Paul Wendkos
Films scored by Lalo Schifrin
1970s crime comedy films
American neo-noir films
American International Pictures films
American crime comedy films
1976 comedy films
1970s English-language films
1970s American films